Penelope Point is a bold rock headland between Nielsen Glacier and Scott Keltie Glacier on the north coast of Victoria Land. First charted by the Northern Party, led by Campbell, of the British Antarctic Expedition, 1910–13. Named by them after the nickname "Penelope" given to Lieutenant Harry L.L. Pennell, commander of the expedition ship Terra Nova.

Headlands of Victoria Land
Pennell Coast